Craig Pass (el.), is a mountain pass located on the Continental Divide in Yellowstone National Park in Wyoming.

The pass was named by Hiram Chittenden for Ida M. Craig (Wilcox), the daughter of a close friend, General James Craig. Ida Craig was purportedly the first tourist to cross the pass after it was completed in September, 1891. Roads are usually open throughout the year, but they may be closed for a short time during winter when the weather is bad.

The small Isa Lake is located just west of the pass on the Grand Loop Road and is noted for striding the Continental Divide and draining into two different watersheds—the Atlantic via the Missouri River and the Pacific via the Snake River.

Notes

Mountain passes of Wyoming
Mountain passes of Teton County, Wyoming
Landforms of Yellowstone National Park
Great Divide of North America
Transportation in Teton County, Wyoming